James Forrest (born 22 September 1944) is a Scottish former professional footballer, who played as a striker for Rangers, Preston, Aberdeen and Hong Kong Rangers.

Career

Club
Forrest was born in Glasgow, raised in the Townhead district of the city and signed for Rangers (the club he supported) as a schoolboy; he was sent for a short period to Drumchapel Amateurs for development. In coming into the first-team, he displaced Jimmy Millar as the successful early 1960s Rangers side was breaking up.

He was known as a prolific goalscorer – in total scoring 145 goals in his 163 games for Rangers, his 50th goal for the club coming in his 45th appearance. He scored 57 goals in the 1964–65 season, just two short of Jimmy McGrory of Celtic who holds the record of most goals scored in a season in British football. Forrest holds the record for number of goals scored for Rangers in a League Cup match, scoring five in an 8–0 victory over Stirling Albion in August 1966. Other highlights included two goals in his first Old Firm appearance in 1963 (when he was aged just 18), four in the 1963 Scottish League Cup Final win over Morton, both goals in the 1964 Scottish League Cup Final victory over Celtic, and another five-goal haul against Hamilton in a 1965 league game.

His Rangers career came to an end shortly after the infamous Scottish Cup defeat to Berwick Rangers in January 1967. He and George McLean were deemed entirely to blame, and both were dropped by manager Scot Symon and transferred within weeks.

After spending a year at Preston, he had a five-year stint at Aberdeen, where he received a Scottish Cup winner's medal in 1970, before transferring to Hong Kong Rangers in 1973.

International
Forrest played five times for Scotland between 1965 and 1971, but did not score. He had also featured for the Under-23 side.

Family
Forrest's cousin, Alex Willoughby, was also a professional footballer. The two were team-mates at Drumchapel, Rangers, Aberdeen and Hong Kong Rangers.

References

External links

1944 births
Footballers from Glasgow
Aberdeen F.C. players
Drumchapel Amateur F.C. players
Association football forwards
Cape Town City F.C. (NFL) players
Expatriate footballers in Hong Kong
Expatriate soccer players in South Africa
Expatriate soccer players in the United States
Hong Kong Rangers FC players
Living people
North American Soccer League (1968–1984) players
Preston North End F.C. players
Rangers F.C. players
San Antonio Thunder players
Scotland under-23 international footballers
Scotland international footballers
Scottish expatriate footballers
Scottish expatriate sportspeople in Hong Kong
Scottish Football League players
Scottish footballers
English Football League players
Hawick Royal Albert F.C. players
Scottish league football top scorers
Scottish expatriate sportspeople in the United States
National Football League (South Africa) players
People from Townhead